The 1995 Gallery Furniture Championships was a women's tennis tournament played on outdoor clay courts at the Westside Tennis Club in Houston, Texas in the United States that was part of Tier II of the 1995 WTA Tour. It was the 25th and last edition of the tournament and was held from April 10 through April 16, 1995. First-seeded Steffi Graf won the singles title and earned $79,000 first-prize money.

Finals

Singles

 Steffi Graf defeated  Åsa Carlsson 6–1, 6–1
 It was Graf's 4th singles title of the year and the 90th of her career.

Doubles

 Nicole Arendt /  Manon Bollegraf defeated  Wiltrud Probst /  Rene Simpson 6–4, 6–2
 It was Arendt's 3rd title of the year and the 5th of her career. It was Bollegraf's 2nd title of the year and the 18th of her career.

External links
 ITF tournament edition details
 Tournament draws

Gallery Furniture Championships
Virginia Slims of Houston
Gallery Furniture Championships
Gallery Furniture Championships
Gallery Furniture Championships
Gallery Furniture Championships